Love Around the Clock (French: La cavalcade des heures) is a 1943 French comedy drama film directed by Yvan Noé and starring Gaby Morlay, Fernandel and Charles Trenet.

Cast
 Gaby Morlay as  La mère de Pierrot  
 Fernandel as Antonin  
 Charles Trenet as Charles  
 Meg Lemonnier as Ginette  
 Jean Chevrier as Le condamné  
 Jean Marchat 
 Jules Ladoumègue as Massardier  
 Jean Daurand as L'ouvrier  
 Jeanne Fusier-Gir as La femme de Léon  
 André Le Gall 
 René Noel as Roger  
 Pierre Juvenet as Le serveur  
 Grandjon as Pierrot  
 Félix Oudart as Le maître d'hôtel  
 Lucien Gallas as André  
 Tramel as Léon  
 Fernand Charpin as Monsieur Maurice  
 Julien Bertheau as Récitant (voice) 
 Simone Antonetti as La marchande de cigarettes  
 Pierrette Caillol as Hora  
 Mona Dol as Germaine  
 Michel Roux as Pierrot 
 Marthe Sarbel as La mère de Monsieur Maurice  
 Simone Antonetti as La marchande de cigarettes  
 Pierrette Caillol as Hora  
 Mona Dol as Germaine  
 Michel Roux as Pierrot  
 Marthe Sarbel as La mère de Monsieur Maurice

References

Bibliography 
 Singer, Barnett. The Americanization of France: Searching for Happiness After the Algerian War. Rowman & Littlefield, 2013.

External links 
 

1943 films
French comedy-drama films
1943 comedy-drama films
1940s French-language films
Films directed by Yvan Noé
French black-and-white films
1940s French films